A One Day International (ODI) is an international  cricket match between two teams, each having ODI status, as determined by the International Cricket Council. The women's variant of the game is similar to the men's version, with minor modifications to umpiring and pitch requirements. The first women's ODI was played in 1973, between England and Australia. The Indian women's team played their first ever ODI match in 1978, against England, after the Women's Cricket Association of India was formed. The Women's Cricket Association of India was merged with the Board of Control for Cricket in India in 2006 as part of the International Cricket Council's initiative to develop women's cricket.

Since the team was formed, 137 women have represented India in ODI cricket. This list includes all players who have played at least one ODI match and is arranged in the order of debut appearance. Where more than one player won their first cap in the same match, those players are listed alphabetically by last name at the time of debut.

Key

ODI cricketers
Statistics are correct as of 24 September 2022.

ODI captains

Notes

References

India
 
Women ODI cricketers
Cricketers